Tacua speciosa is a very large Southeast Asian species of cicada. It is the only member of the genus Tacua.

Description
Megapomponia, Pomponia and  Tacua are the largest cicadas in the world. Tacua speciosa has black wings, a yellow-green collar, a red transverse stripe on the thorax and a turquoise-blue abdomen.

Distribution
This species can be found in Borneo, Sumatra, Java, Singapore, Malay Peninsula. It was once described as from North East India but it seems to be a mistake.

Notes

References
 Biolib
 Zipcodezoo
 M.I. Zaidi W. Nordin, M. Maryati, A. Wahab, M.F. Norashikin, K. Catherine and A. Fatimah - Cicada (Homoptera: Ciadoidea) Fauna of Crocker Range Park, Sabah - Asean Review of Biodiversity and Environmental Conservation (ARBEC) July–September 2002  Arbec.com
 "Notes on Indian Rhynchota - Homoptera"
https://www.cicadamania.com/cicadas/tacua-speciosa/

External links

A detailed photo of a T. speciosa

Insects of Borneo
Insects of Myanmar
Insects of Indonesia
Insects of Java
Insects of Malaysia
Insects of Thailand
Taxa named by Johann Karl Wilhelm Illiger
Insects described in 1800
Cryptotympanini